Khaskheli is a Sindhi tribe in Sindh and Balochistan, Pakistan. The tribe trace its linkages as offshoot of Samma tribe in Sindh.

Khasakhel is a tribe in Sindh.

References
 

Sindhi tribes
Social groups of Pakistan